Nobue is a feminine Japanese given name. Notable people with the name include:

Betty Nobue Kano (born 1944), Japanese artist
, Japanese gymnast

Fictional characters
, a character in the manga series Strawberry Marshmallow
, a character in the anime series A Place Further than the Universe

Japanese feminine given names